Prisca Coborn (1622-1701) was the wealthy widow of Thomas Coborn/Colbourne, a brewer in Bow who died in 1675 a couple of months after they married.

In fact 1675 was an interesting year for that family. In January of that year Thomas' first wife died after giving birth to their daughter Alice. Thomas married Prisca later that year and Thomas rewrote his will to include Prisca and Alice and then he died. All in 1675! That left Prisca (who was in her fifties), looking after Alice who died aged 15 just before she was due to be married. In fact she was buried on her Wedding Day.

Prisca (née Forster) established the Coborn School for Girls in Bow after she died in 1701, through the terms of her will (dated 6 May 1701). She also gave money to help the poor of Bow and Stepney in the East End of London.

She was baptised at St Mary's Church, Bow on 30 August 1622.

Locally, she is remembered by the street names, Coborn Road and Coborn Street, The Coborn Arms public house is not named after Prisca Coborn, that is named after Charles Coborn, an East End Music Hall singer. However, the Coborn Centre for Adolescent Mental Health is.

Prisca, Alice, Thomas and Prisca's parents are all buried in Bow Church.

Notes

1622 births
1701 deaths